Avinash–Vishwajeet are a Marathi film composer duo consisting of Avinash and Vishwajeet Joshi. They have written the scores for films such as Sanngto Aika…!, Popat, Premachi Goshta, Badam Rani Gulam Chor, Mumbai-Pune-Mumbai.
Avinash–Vishwajeet is their professional name and appears on the covers of their music CDs and DVDs.  Apart from music direction, Vishwajeet Joshi is also a lyricist.

Early life

Musical career
They began their career in 2007, composing music for many Marathi movies.

Avinash-Vishwajeet filmography

References

Indian male composers
Living people
Marathi film score composers
Songwriting teams
Male film score composers
Year of birth missing (living people)